Opolski (feminine Opolska, neuter Opolskie, plural Opolscy) may refer to:

 Uniwersytet Opolski
 Politechnika Opolska
 Powiat opolski (disambiguation)
 Opole Voivodeship (Province)
 Góry Opolskie
 Kąty Opolskie
 Rogów Opolski
 Strzelce Opolskie
 Gmina Strzelce Opolskie
 Strzelce Opolskie County
 Tarnów Opolski
 Gmina Tarnów Opolski

 Family name
 Jarosław Opolski (means "Jarosław, Duke of Opole")
 Nicholas Opolski, an Australian actor
 Władysław Opolski (means "Władysław of Opole")

See also 
 Władysław Opolczyk
 Oppolzer

Polish-language surnames